In Norse mythology, Draupnir (Old Norse: , "the dripper") is a gold ring possessed by the god Odin with the ability to multiply itself: Every ninth night, eight new rings 'drip' from Draupnir, each one of the same size and weight as the original.

Draupnir was forged by the dwarven brothers Brokkr and Eitri (or Sindri). Brokkr and Eitri made this ring as one of a set of three gifts which included Mjöllnir and Gullinbursti. They made these gifts in accordance with a bet Loki made saying that Brokkr and Eitri could not make better gifts than the three made by the Sons of Ivaldi. In the end, Mjöllnir, Thor's hammer, won the contest for Brokkr and Eitri. Loki used a loophole to get out of the wager for his head (the wager was for Loki's head only, but he argued that, to remove his head, they would have to injure his neck, which was not in the bargain) and Brokkr punished him by sealing his lips shut with wire.

The ring was placed by Odin on the funeral pyre of his son Baldr:
Odin laid upon the pyre the gold ring called Draupnir; this quality attended it: that every ninth night there fell from it eight gold rings of equal weight. (from the Gylfaginning).

The ring was subsequently retrieved by Hermóðr. It was offered as a gift by Freyr's servant Skírnir in the wooing of Gerðr, which is described in the poem Skírnismál.

In popular culture

Draupnir is represented as a card in the Yu-Gi-Oh Trading Card Game. It has an effect that mimics the multiplication ability of the mythological version. If it is destroyed by another card's effect, you can add another "Nordic Relic" card to your hand. 

Draupnir also has a representation in the Magic: The Gathering set Kaldheim, which is based on Nordic mythology. The card Replicating Ring adds a night counter to itself each turn, and once eight counters are put on it, it makes eight Replicated Rings.

DRAUPNIR was revealed as the key to a website that Neal Caffrey and Mozzie used to view their stolen Nazi U-boat treasure in "Taking Account", the seventh episode of the third season of White Collar.

It also appeared in episode 11 of Saint Seiya: Soul of Gold as a tool to seal Loki's spirit.

The Draupnir is never called by name but is simply known as Odin's ring in the first three books of the Witches of East End novels. This ring allows the wearer to teleport to any place of the nine worlds, and a copy of equal power was once owned by Loki before it was destroyed by Freya.

In God of War Ragnarök, Draupnir is brought by Brok to a Svartalfheim mermaid revered by the dwarves as the Lady of the Forge, who magically binds the bauble to a spearhead to create a god-killing spear endowed with the ability to replicate and remotely detonate itself. The newly-minted Draupnir Spear is then given to protagonist Kratos to help him defeat the spiteful Aesir god Heimdall before the latter could carry out his plan to assassinate Kratos' son, Atreus.

Notes

References

 Orchard, Andy (1997). Dictionary of Norse Myth and Legend. Cassell. 

Artifacts in Norse mythology
Odin
Individual rings
Magic rings